Melrose is a locality and small rural community in the local government areas of Devonport and Kentish in the North West region of Tasmania.
The 2016 census determined a population of 102 for the state suburb of Melrose.

History 
The name “Melrose” was used for a post station in the district in 1888. A railway station on the former Don River Line was renamed Melrose about 1916. Two options for the source of the name are:
 Melrose, a town in Scotland.
 George Melrose, a surveyor who worked in the area in 1853, who is believed to have named Melrose Creek after himself.
The Jeffery and Denney families were prominent in the area for some time with both families running the post office and farming in the area.  Arthur and Robina Denney ran the post office and farmed in the areas.  Robina was a Jeffrey before marrying Arthur.  They had 4 children and later in life lived in Devonport.  The families intermarried.  Arthur and Robina were first cousins and shared grandparents.  Many families intermarried as a result of the lack of men after WW1.   
Melrose was gazetted as a locality in 1962.

Geography
The Don River forms part of the eastern boundary. Porcupine Hill Forest Reserve abuts part of the western boundary.

Road infrastructure
The C145 route enters the locality from the north as Bellamy Road, becomes Melrose Road, and exits to the south-west as Paloona Road. Route C146 (Melrose Road) starts at an intersection with route C145 and exits to the north-east. Melrose Road continues south-east as Route C147 before exiting to the south.

See also
 Locations in Australia with a Scottish name

References

Devonport, Tasmania
Localities of Kentish Council
Towns in Tasmania